The Natural Resources Building is a government building in Olympia, Washington that houses Washington's Department of Natural Resources, Department of Fish and Wildlife, and Department of Agriculture. The  structure includes  of office space and a  parking garage for 1,360 vehicles.

The Natural Resources Building received an award from the Architecture and Energy Building Excellence in the Northwest Awards Program.

Government buildings in Washington (state)
Washington State Capitol campus